Fredrick O. Tackett (born August 30, 1945) is an American songwriter and multi-instrumentalist. Originally a session player on guitar, mandolin, and trumpet, he is best known as a member of the band Little Feat.

In addition to his work with Little Feat, Tackett has played and recorded with many notable artists, Bob Dylan and Jimmy Webb among them. He had an additional side project with another member of Little Feat; he performed as part of a duo with Paul Barrere, as Paul and Fred.

Association with Little Feat

Tackett's association with Little Feat goes back to a friendship with the founder of the band, Lowell George, at the time of its inception. Working as a session player for other musicians, he continued his friendship with the bandmates, and contributed a song Fool Yourself to their third album Dixie Chicken as well as acoustic guitar. He also contributed guitar to their sixth album Time Loves a Hero.

In 1979 he co-wrote songs with Lowell George for both George's first (and only) solo project Thanks, I'll Eat It Here,  and Little Feat's album Down on the Farm. It was during work on the latter that the group's break-up was announced. Lowell George died shortly afterwards.

In 1983, he performed on the Antilles Records release Swingrass '83.

Joining Little Feat

In 1988 Little Feat reformed despite the absence of their former front man, and prolific singer, songwriter, and slide guitarist, Lowell George. The regrouped Little Feat included former members Paul Barrere, Richie Hayward, Bill Payne, Kenny Gradney, and Sam Clayton, with the addition of Tackett and Craig Fuller. All had been former members of Little Feat, except Fuller and Tackett, who had previously made songwriting contributions and session work for the band. Fuller left in 1993, to be replaced by female vocalist Shaun Murphy who remained with the group until 2009. Tackett has remained with Little Feat since the day he joined, and has become an integral member of the band.

Fred Tackett has played a pivotal role in Little Feat's music. In addition to his guitar work, he plays trumpet and mandolin and has co-written several of their songs, forging an active and regular writing partnership with Paul Barrere which has produced such songs as "Marginal Creatures" and "Night On The Town". The 2003 album Kickin' It at the Barn featured Tackett's debut as a lead vocalist on his own song "In A Town Like This" which was also the title track from his solo debut album released that year.

Paul and Fred

Tackett's writing partnership with Barrere has developed into a separate act where the two performed as a duo. This has produced two live albums and a DVD. They have also spent time between gigs when touring to perform in local radio stations, playing songs that do not require a lot of changing of instruments, to travel as lightly as possible.

Discography

As Little Feat session musician
 Dixie Chicken 1973
 Time Loves a Hero 1977
 Down on the Farm 1979

As Little Feat group member
 Let It Roll 1988
 Representing the Mambo 1990
 Shake Me Up 1991
 Ain't Had Enough Fun 1995
 Under the Radar 1998
 Chinese Work Songs 2000
 Kickin' It at the Barn 2003
 Rooster Rag 2012

Little Feat Live albums
 Live From Neon Park 1996
 Live at the Rams Head 2002
 Down Upon the Suwannee River 2003
 Highwire Act Live in St. Louis 2003 2004
 Barnstormin' Live 2005
 Rocky Mountain Jam 2007

Little Feat Live compilations
 Ripe Tomatos Volume One 2002
 Raw Tomatos Volume One 2002

Paul and Fred
 Live from North Cafe 2001
 Sights and Sounds DVD 2005
 Live in the UK 2008 2009

Solo
 In a Town Like This 2003
 Silver Strings 2010

Collaborations 
With Peter Allen
 I Could Have Been a Sailor (A&M Records, 1979)
 Not the Boy Next Door (Arista Records, 1983)

With Mephistopheles 
 In Frustration I Hear Singing (Reprise Records, 1969)

With Thelma Houston
 Sunshower (Dunhill Records, 1969)
 Breakwater Cat (RCA Records, 1980)

With Kenny Loggins
 Keep the Fire (Columbia Records, 1979)
 The Unimaginable Life (Columbia Records, 1997)

With Boz Scaggs
 Silk Degrees (Columbia Records, 1976)
 Some Change (Virgin Records, 1994)
 Fade into Light (MVP Japan, 1996)
 Come on Home (Virgin Records, 1997)

With Carole Bayer Sager
 Sometimes Late at Night (The Broadwark Entertainment, 1981)

With Steve Harley
 Hobo with a Grin (EMI, 1978)

With Tanya Tucker
 Should I Do It (MCA Records, 1981)

With Richard Harris
 The Yard Went On Forever (Dunhill Records, 1968)

With Tim Moore
 White Shadows (Asylum Records, 1977)

With Lauren Wood
 Lauren Wood (Capitol Records, 1979)

With Alfie Boe
 Trust (Decca Records, 2013)

With Fleetwood Mac
 Time (Warner Bros. Records, 1995)

With Clint Black
 Looking for Christmas (RCA Records, 1995)
 Nothin' but the Taillights (RCA Records, 1997)
 Christmas with You (Equity, 2004)

With Judy Collins
 Hard Times for Lovers (Elektra Records, 1979)

With Brenda Russell
 Brenda Russell (Horizon Records, 1979)

With Howdy Moon
 Howdy Moon (A&M Records, 1974)

With Helen Reddy
 Music, Music (Capitol Records, 1976)

With The 5th Dimension
 Portrait (Bell, 1970)
 Love's Lines, Angles and Rhymes (Bell, 1971)
 Individually & Collectively (Bell, 1972)
 Living Together, Growing Together (Bell, 1973)
 Earthbound (ABC Records, 1975)

With Willie Nelson
 Across the Borderline (Columbia Records, 1993)

With Janis Ian
 Restless Eyes (Columbia Records, 1981)

With Russ Ballard
 At the Third Stroke (Epic Records, 1978)

With Harry Nilsson
 Sandman (RCA Victor, 1976)
 ...That's The Way It Is (RCA Victor, 1976)
 Flash Harry (Mercury Records, 1980)

With Livingston Taylor
 Three Way Mirror (Epic Records, 1978)

With Arlo Guthrie
 Power of Love (Warner Bros. Records, 1981)

With Patti Dahlstrom
 Your Place or Mine (20th Century Records, 1975)

With Adam Mitchell
 Redhead in Trouble (Warner Bros. Records, 1979)

With Eddie Rabbitt
 Rabbitt Trax (RCA Records, 1986)

With Danniebelle Hall
 This Moment (Light Records, 1975)
 He Is King (Light Records, 1976)
 Let Me Have a Dream (Light Records, 1977)

With Jesse Colin Young
 The Perfect Stranger (Elektra Records, 1982)

With Tom Snow
 Tom Snow (Capitol Records, 1976)

With Bob Seger
 Like a Rock (Capitol Records, 1986)
 The Fire Inside (Capitol Records, 1991)
 It's a Mystery (Capitol Records, 1995)

With Clair Marlo
 Let it Go (Sheffield Lab, 1989)

With Linda Ronstadt
 We Ran (Elektra Records, 1998)

With Captain & Tennille
 Make Your Move (Casablanca Records, 1979)

With A. J. Croce
 A. J. Croce (Private Music, 1993)

With Rickie Lee Jones
 Rickie Lee Jones (Warner Bros. Records, 1979)

With Michael Martin Murphey
 Michael Martin Murphey (Liberty Records, 1982)

With Richard Thompson
 Amnesia (Capitol Records, 1988)

With Valerie Carter
 Just a Stone's Throw Away (Columbia Records, 1977)
 Wild Child (ARC, 1978)

With Deborah Allen
 Cheat the Night (RCA Records, 1983)

With Michel Polnareff
 Michel Polnareff (Atlantic Records, 1975)

With Marcia Hines
 Ooh Child (Miracle Records, 1979)

With Lionel Richie
 Lionel Richie (Motown Records, 1982)
 Can't Slow Down (Motown Records, 1983)

With Nicolette Larson
 Nicolette (Warner Bros. Records, 1978)
 In the Nick of Time (Warner Bros. Records, 1979)
 Radioland (Warner Bros. Records, 1981)
 All Dressed Up and No Place to Go (Warner Bros. Records, 1982)

With Cher and Gregg Allman
 Two the Hard Way (Warner Bros. Records, 1977)

With Glen Campbell
 Rhinestone Cowboy (Capitol Records, 1975)
 Bloodline (Capitol Records, 1976)
 Southern Nights (Capitol Records, 1977)
 Basic (Capitol Records, 1978)
 Highwayman (Capitol Records, 1979)
 It's the World Gone Crazy (Capitol Records, 1981)

With Lori Lieberman
 A Piece of Time (Capitol Records, 1974)

With Anne Murray
 The Hottest Night of the Year (Capitol Records, 1982)

With Elkie Brooks
 Live and Learn (A&M Records, 1979)

With Rod Stewart
 Atlantic Crossing (Warner Bros. Records, 1975)
 A Night on the Town (Warner Bros. Records, 1976)
 Foot Loose & Fancy Free (Warner Bros. Records, 1977)
 Blondes Have More Fun (Warner Bros. Records, 1978)

With Juice Newton
 Well Kept Secret (Capitol Records, 1978)
 Take Heart (Capitol Records, 1979)
 Juice (Capitol Records, 1981)
 Quiet Lies (Capitol Records, 1982)
 Dirty Looks (Capitol Records, 1983)
 Can't Wait All Night (RCA Records, 1984)
 Old Flame (RCA Records, 1985)

With Mary MacGregor
 ...In Your Eyes (Ariola Records, 1978)

With Michael McDonald
 Blink of an Eye (Reprise Records, 1993)

With Bette Midler
 Broken Blossom (Atlantic Records, 1977)

With Barbra Streisand
 Wet (Columbia Records, 1979)

With Eric Carmen
 Change of Heart (Arista Records, 1978)
 Tonight You're Mine (Arista Records, 1980)

With J. D. Souther
 You're Only Lonely (Columbia Records, 1979)

With Kenny Rogers
 Share Your Love (Liberty Records, 1981)
 Love Will Turn You Around (Liberty Records, 1982)
 We've Got Tonight (Liberty Records, 1983)
 Eyes That See in the Dark (RCA Records, 1983)
 What About Me? (RCA Records, 1984)
 The Heart of the Matter (RCA Records, 1985)
 I Prefer the Moonlight (RCA Records, 1987)

With Johnny Rivers
 Outside Help (Big Tree Records, 1977)

With Van Dyke Parks
 Jump! (Warner Bros. Records, 1984)

With Ringo Starr
 Stop and Smell the Roses (RCA Records, 1981)

With Sanne Salomonsen
 Language of the Heart (Virgin Records, 1994)

With The Wallflowers
 Bringing Down the Horse (Interscope Records, 1996)

With Debby Boone
 Surrender (Sparrow Records, 1983)

With Bonnie Raitt
 Home Plate (Warner Bros. Records, 1975)
 Sweet Forgiveness (Warner Bros. Records, 1977)

With Aaron Neville
 The Grand Tour (A&M Records, 1993)

With Dolly Parton
 Heartbreak Express (RCA Records, 1982)

With Barry Manilow
 Barry (Arista Records, 1980)

With Christine Lakeland
 Veranda (Comet Records, 1984)

With Van Dyke Parks and Brian Wilson
 Orange Crate Art (Warner Bros. Records, 1995)

With Leo Sayer
 Thunder in My Heart (Chrysalis Records, 1977)
 Leo Sayer (Chrysalis Records, 1978)
 Here (Chrysalis Records, 1979)

With Rita Coolidge
 It's Only Love (A&M Records, 1975)
 Satisfied (A&M Records, 1979)
 Heartbreak Radio (A&M Records, 1981)
 Dancing with an Angel (Attic, 1991)

With Collin Raye
 All I Can Be (Epic Records, 1991)

With Jackson Browne
 The Pretender (Asylum Records, 1976)

With Cher
 Stars (Warner Bros. Records, 1975)

With Vince Gill
 When I Call Your Name (MCA Records, 1989)

With Neil Diamond
 Heartlight (Columbia Records, 1982)

With Jennifer Warnes
 Famous Blue Raincoat (Cypress Records, 1986)

With Tom Waits
 Swordfishtrombones (Island Records, 1983)

With Paul Anka
 The Music Man (United Artists Records, 1977)
 Headlines (RCA Victor, 1979)

With Carly Simon
 Another Passenger (Elektra Records, 1976)

With Ted Gärdestad
 Blue Virgin Isles (Polar, 1978)

With Jimmy Webb
 Words and Music (Reprise Records, 1970)
 And So: On (Reprise Records, 1971)
 Letters (Reprise Records, 1972)
 Land's End (Asylum Records, 1974)
 El Mirage (Atlantic Records, 1977)
 Angel Heart (Real West, 1982)

With Joan Baez
 Recently (Gold Castle, 1987)

With Joe Dassin
 Blue Country (CBS, 1979)

With Bob Dylan
 Saved (Columbia Records, 1980)
 Shot of Love (Columbia Records, 1981)
 The Bootleg Series Vol. 13: Trouble No More 1979–1981 (Columbia Records, 2017)

With Kenny Rogers and Dolly Parton
 Once Upon a Christmas (RCA Records, 1984)

References

External links
http://www.littlefeat.net/ Little Feat official
Paul Barrere and Fred Tackett Acoustic Duo collection at the Internet Archive's live music archive

1945 births
Living people
Musicians from Little Rock, Arkansas
Guitarists from Arkansas
American rock guitarists
Place of birth missing (living people)
Little Feat members
American session musicians
American male songwriters
American male singers
Lead guitarists
Rhythm guitarists
American blues guitarists
American male guitarists
American mandolinists
American trumpeters
American male trumpeters
Oklahoma City University alumni
20th-century American guitarists
Relix Records artists